The 2017 Mid-Eastern Athletic Conference baseball tournament began on May 17 and ended on May 20 at Arthur W. Perdue Stadium, in Salisbury, MD. It was a six team double-elimination tournament.  won the tournament and claimed the Mid-Eastern Athletic Conference's automatic bid to the 2017 NCAA Division I baseball tournament. The Wildcats won their sixteenth tournament out of the nineteen events, with Florida A&M winning in 2015, Savannah State in 2013 and North Carolina A&T earning the 2005 title.

Format and seeding
The top three teams in each division were seeded one through three based on regular season records. The two division winners earned a first round bye, with the second seed from each division playing the third seed from the opposite division in the first round. The winners advanced in the winners' bracket, while first round losers played elimination games.

Bracket

All-Tournament Team
The following players were named to the All-Tournament Team.

Outstanding performer
Bethune-Cookman first baseman Danny Rodriguez was named Tournament Outstanding Performer.

References

Tournament
Mid-Eastern Athletic Conference Baseball Tournament
Mid-Eastern Athletic Conference Baseball
Mid-Eastern Athletic Conference Baseball